Robert J. "Bob" DiCarlo is a former Republican Party lawmaker from Brooklyn, New York who served in the New York State Senate from 1993 to 1996 representing Bay Ridge in Brooklyn as well as Staten Island's East Shore.
He is the son of former New York State Assemblyman Dominick DiCarlo.
In 2007 he ran unsuccessfully for Brookhaven, New York Supervisor.

References

External links

Year of birth missing (living people)
Living people
American people of Italian descent
Republican Party New York (state) state senators
People from Brooklyn
People from Suffolk County, New York